Cameron Brate (born July 3, 1991) is an American football tight end who is a free agent. He played college football at Harvard.

Early life 
Brate grew up in Naperville, Illinois and attended Naperville Central High School, where he played high school football and basketball.

College career
Brate attended and played college football at Harvard. He redshirted in the 2010 season and contributed to the 2011–2013 seasons.

Professional career

Tampa Bay Buccaneers

2014
On May 21, 2014, the Tampa Bay Buccaneers signed Brate to a three-year, $1.53 million contract that includes a signing bonus of $3,000 as an undrafted free agent.

Throughout training camp, Brate competed for a roster spot as a backup tight end against Ian Thompson. On August 30, 2014, the Tampa Bay Buccaneers waived Brate, but signed him to their practice squad the next day. On November 25, 2014, the Tampa Bay Buccaneers promoted Brate to their active roster. Upon joining the active roster, head coach Lovie Smith named Brate the fifth tight end on the depth chart, behind Austin Seferian-Jenkins, Brandon Myers, Luke Stocker, and D.J. Williams. On November 30, 2014, Brate made his professional regular season debut and earned his first career start and caught a 17-yard pass during a 14–13 loss against the Cincinnati Bengals in Week 13. Brate earned his first career start after Austin Seferian-Jenkins, Luke Stocker, and Brandon Myers all suffered injuries and were unable to play. He finished his rookie season in 2014 with one reception for 17 yards in five games and one start.

2015
Brate entered training camp slated as a backup tight end and competed for a roster spot against Tim Wright and Evan Rodriguez. On September 6, 2015, the Tampa Bay Buccaneers waived Brate as part of their final roster cuts, but signed him to their practice squad two days later. On September 15, 2015, the Tampa Bay Buccaneers officially released Brate from their practice squad.

New Orleans Saints 
On September 16, 2015, the New Orleans Saints signed Brate to their practice squad.

Tampa Bay Buccaneers (second stint) 
On September 22, 2015, the Tampa Bay Buccaneers signed Brate from the New Orleans Saints’ practice squad and to their active roster after Austin Seferian-Jenkins suffered a shoulder injury. The Buccaneers signed Brate to a one-year, $510,000 contract. Head coach Lovie Smith named Brate the third tight end on the depth chart, behind Luke Stocker and Brandon Myers.

On November 1, 2015, Brate caught two passes for 48 yards and scored his first career touchdown during a 23–20 win at the Atlanta Falcons in Week 8. Brate caught his first career touchdown reception on a 20-yard pass by Jameis Winston during the second quarter. In Week 12, he caught a season-high five passes for 53 receiving yards and a touchdown during a 25–12 loss at the Indianapolis Colts. He finished the season with 23 receptions for 288 receiving yards and three touchdown receptions in 14 games and four starts.

2016
On January 6, 2016, the Tampa Bay Buccaneers fired head coach Lovie Smith after they finished the previous season with a 6–10 record. On January 15, 2016, the Tampa Bay Buccaneers announced their decision to promote offensive coordinator Dirk Koetter to head coach. Brate entered training camp slated as a backup tight end, but began challenging Austin Seferian-Jenkins for the starting role. Head coach Dirk Koetter named Brate one of the primary starting tight ends to begin the regular season, alongside Luke Stocker.

On September 25, 2016, Brate caught five passes for 56 yards and two touchdowns during a 37–32 loss against the Los Angeles Rams in Week 3. In Week 10, he made a season-high seven receptions for 84 receiving yards and a touchdown as the Buccaneers defeated the Chicago Bears 36–10. On December 4, 2016, Brate made six catches for a season-high 86 receiving yards and a touchdown during a 28–21 win against the San Diego Chargers. On December 27, 2016, the Tampa Bay Buccaneers placed Brate on injured reserve due to a back injury. He finished the 2016 NFL season with 57 receptions for 660 receiving yards and eight touchdowns in 15 games and ten starts. Among NFL tight ends, Brate converted the highest percentage of red zone targets into touchdowns in 2016.

2017
On February 28, 2017, the Tampa Bay Buccaneers placed a one-year, $690,000 exclusive rights tender in Brate. On April 17, 2017, Brate signed his exclusive rights tender to remain with the Tampa Bay Buccaneers. During training camp, Brate competed to be the primary starting tight end against rookie first round pick O. J. Howard. Head coach Dirk Koetter named Brate the secondary starting tight end to begin the regular season, behind O.J. Howard. On October 1, 2017, Brate caught four passes for a season-high 80 yards and caught a 14-yard pass by Jameis Winston during a 25–23 victory against the New York Giants in Week 4. In Week 6, Brate made a season-high six catches for 76 receiving yards and caught one touchdown reception as the Buccaneers lost 38–33 at the Arizona Cardinals in Week 6. Brate finished the season with 48 receptions for 591 receiving yards and six touchdowns in 16 games and five starts.

2018
On March 12, 2018, the Tampa Bay Buccaneers signed Brate to a six-year, $40.8 million contract that includes $18 million guaranteed. Head coach Dirk Koetter retained Brate and O.J. Howard as the starting tight ends to begin the regular season. In Week 13, Brate had three receptions for a season-high 36 receiving yards during a 24–17 victory against the Carolina Panthers. Overall, Brate finished the 2018 season with 30 receptions for 289 receiving yards and six receiving touchdowns.

2019
In the 2019 season, Brate appeared in all 16 games, of which he started six. In Week 11, against the New Orleans Saints, he had a career-high ten receptions for 73 receiving yards in the 34–17 loss. He finished with 36 receptions for 311 receiving yards and four receiving touchdowns.

2020
In the 2020 regular season, Brate played in all 16 games and recorded 28 receptions for 282 receiving yards and two receiving touchdowns.

In the NFC Championship against the Green Bay Packers, Brate recorded three catches for 19 yards and a touchdown during the 31–26 win.
In Super Bowl LV against the Kansas City Chiefs, Brate recorded three catches for 26 yards during the 31–9 win.

During the Super Bowl boat parade in Tampa, Brate made one of the most famous catches of his career. Tom Brady threw the Vince Lombardi Trophy from a moving boat in open water to the boat filled with receivers and it was Brate who caught the trophy.

2021
In 2021, Brate caught 30 passes for 245 yards and 4 receiving touchdowns.

On March 17, 2023, Brate was released by the Buccaneers.

NFL career statistics

Regular season

References

External links 
 Harvard Crimson bio 
 Tampa Bay Buccaneers bio

1991 births
Living people
American football tight ends
Harvard Crimson football players
Tampa Bay Buccaneers players
New Orleans Saints players
Sportspeople from Naperville, Illinois
Players of American football from Illinois